Bokhorst was an Amt ("collective municipality") in the district of Plön, in Schleswig-Holstein, Germany. It was situated approximately 25 km south of Kiel. The seat of the Amt was Schillsdorf. In January 2008, it was merged with the Amt Wankendorf to form the Amt Bokhorst-Wankendorf.

The Amt Bokhorst consisted of the following municipalities (population as of 2005):
 Bönebüttel (2.042 inhabitants) 
 Großharrie (567 inhabitants) 
 Rendswühren (793 inhabitants) 
 Schillsdorf (896 inhabitants) 
 Tasdorf (363 inhabitants)

Former Ämter in Schleswig-Holstein